Vasse Highway is a Western Australian highway connecting Busselton and the South Western Highway  south of Manjimup.

From Busselton, it starts as State Route 104 from the Bussell Highway 3 km east of Busselton, near the Sir Stuart Bovell sporting complex, and travels the 56 km to Nannup, where it intersects with the Brockman Highway and becomes State Route 10. It then passes Donnelly River and Karri Valley Resort, and 22 km west of Pemberton turnoffs provide entrances to the Beedelup National Park.

About 4 km before Pemberton, the highway ends at a T junction. A left turn continues unsigned as Vasse Highway into the town of Pemberton, then for another 19 km until ending at South Western Highway near Diamond Tree 15 km south of Manjimup.  A right turn continues southwards as State Route 10 to Northcliffe, allowing access to the Warren National Park. Route 10 then heads east along Middleton Road, meeting with the South Western Highway near the Shannon mill.

Cities and towns
 Busselton
 Yoongarillup
 Nannup
 Donnelly River
 Pemberton

See also

 Highways in Australia
 List of highways in Western Australia

References 

Highways in rural Western Australia